MP3 is a digital audio format.

MP3 may also refer to:

Media
MP3: Mera Pehla Pehla Pyaar, a 2007 Indian film
MP3 (Marcy Playground album), 2004
MP3 (M. Pokora album), 2008
"MP3", the first track on the 2014 album Simplicity by Tesla

Other uses
MP3.com, an online music downloads website
Mazda MP3, or Mazda Familia a car
Piaggio MP3, a three-wheeled motorized vehicle
Møller–Plesset perturbation of order three
Max Payne 3

See also 
 MPEG-3, a group of audio and video coding standards